The Ambassador and Permanent Representative of Australia to the United Nations Office in Geneva is an officer of the Australian Department of Foreign Affairs and Trade and the head of the delegation of the Commonwealth of Australia to the United Nations Office in Geneva, Switzerland, and also as Permanent Representative of Australia to the Conference on Disarmament. 

The position has the rank and status of an Ambassador Extraordinary and Plenipotentiary and has been sent since the establishment of the European Office of the United Nations in Geneva on 14 December 1949. The United Nations Office in Geneva includes the headquarters of various international organisations including the World Health Organization, the United Nations Human Rights Council, the United Nations High Commissioner for Refugees and the International Labour Organization. From 1949 to 1973 the role was titled 'Permanent Delegate'. Since 1973, Australia's representation to the General Agreement on Tariffs and Trade, and its successor the World Trade Organization, have been undertaken by a separate ambassador. From 1983 to 1997 there was a separate Permanent Representative to the Conference on Disarmament, but from its establishment in 1979 to 1983 and from 1997 to present it has been held by the present office.

List of office holders

Permanent Representatives to the Conference on Disarmament

References

External links
Australian Permanent Mission and Consulate-General Geneva, Switzerland

 
 
United Nations Office in Geneva